is a professional Japanese baseball player. He plays pitcher for the Tohoku Rakuten Golden Eagles.

External links

NPB.com

1988 births
Living people
Baseball people from Okayama Prefecture
Waseda University alumni
Japanese baseball players
Nippon Professional Baseball pitchers
Hiroshima Toyo Carp players
Tohoku Rakuten Golden Eagles players